The Ducati 749 is a 90° V-twin Desmodromic valve actuated engine sport bike built by Ducati Motor Holding between 2003 and 2006.  Designed by Pierre Terblanche, the 749 was available as the 749, 749 Dark, 749S, and 749R. It shared many of its parts with the 999, with the exception of a slightly smaller 180/55 profile rear tire, smaller cylinders, and different cylinder heads, giving it a smaller displacement of 748 cc.  This smaller engine is higher revving and produces a lower peak horsepower than the larger engine used in the 999.  The 749S model, like the 999, incorporates features rarely found on production motorcycles, including adjustable rake (23.5° or 24.5°) and five-position adjustable rearset mounts.

A limited number of the 749 were manufactured as a race version — the 749R — each with their production number stamped on the triple clamp – and initially cost almost twice the original 749 base model.  This race model was lighter, had a shorter stroke, increased bore and larger valves which allowed it to run more efficiently at higher RPM, and hence, produced more torque and power than the 749/S models.  The 749R also came with a larger fuel tank; slipper clutch; Öhlins forks, shock and steering damper; racing cams; titanium valves, valve guides, and connecting rods; magnesium head covers, and carbon fiber belt covers.  Its 2004 model had carbon fiber fairings.

The 749 was replaced by the Ducati 848 for the 2008 model year.

Specifications

Chassis
 Front suspension: Showa 43 mm upside-down fully adjustable fork 
 Front wheel travel: 125 mm (4.9 in)
 Front wheel: Y-shaped 5-spoke light alloy 3.50 x 17 
 Rear suspension: Progressive linkage with fully adjustable Sachs monoshock 
 Rear wheel travel: 128 mm (5.0 in) 
 Rear wheel: Y-shaped 5-spoke light alloy 5.50 x 17 
 Instruments: Speedometer, tachometer, high beam indicator, turn signals, oil pressure warning light, low fuel warning light, neutral light, water temperature, outside temperature gauge, fuel consumption, battery voltage, immobilizer system 
 Versions: Biposto & Monoposto

Transmission
 Gearbox: 6 speed 
 Ratios: 1st 37/15, 2nd 30/17, 3rd 28/20, 4th 26/22, 5th 24/23, 6th 23/24 
 Primary drive: Straight cut gears; ratio 1.84 
 Final drive: Chain; Front sprocket 14; Rear sprocket 39 
 Clutch: Dry multiplate with hydraulic control

External links

 Ducati 749 Review
 Ducati 749 technical specifications
 Ducati 749S technical specifications 
 Ducati 749R technical specifications

749
Sport bikes
Motorcycles introduced in 2003
Motorcycles designed by Pierre Terblanche